Demsky (Demski, Demska) is a Polish-language surname, may refer to:

 Aaron Demsky, professor of biblical history
 Izzy Demsky, a name used by American actor Kirk Douglas (1916-2020)
 Danielle Demski, an Arizona beauty pageant winner who has competed in the Miss Teen USA and Miss USA pageants
 Joel S. Demski (born 1940), American accounting researcher and educator
 Nic Demski (born 1993), Canadian football slotback
 Pavlin Demski (died 1656), Catholic missionary

See also 
 Dębski
 Dembski
 Demsky City District, a city district of Ufa in the Republic of Bashkortostan, Russia

Polish-language surnames